Brigadier General Chris Gildenhuys  is a South African Army officer.

Military career 
On 24 January 2014 he handed over command of the South African Army Armoured Formation to Brig Gen Andre Retief. He was transferred to the Joint Operations Division as Director of Operations from 25 January 2014 where he served until his retirement.

He served as a Military Attache in Washington from 1997 to 1999.

Gen Gildenhuys retired from the SA Army on the 31 October 2016.

Awards and decorations

References

South African Army generals
Living people
Year of birth missing (living people)
Military attachés